Charles-René Laitié (1782 – 11 December 1862) was a French sculptor.

Early years

Charles-René Laitié was born in Paris in 1782. He became a pupil of Claude Dejoux (1732–1816).
He also studied under Pierre Cartellier.
He won a medal from the Royal School in the year XII, and the Grand Prix de Rome in 1804.
The prize was awarded for his Méléagre refusant son secours aux habitans de Calydon.
While in Rome in 1806 Laitié made a plaster model of Homer.
In 1827 he presented a small bronze at the Salon from this model, with the date 1806.

Bourbon Restoration

In 1820 Laitié was commissioned by the state to make a statue of Jean de La Fontaine, the poet. 
It was exhibited in the salon in 1822 and installed in Château-Thierry on 6 November 1824.
He won a gold medal at the Salon of 1824.
The sculptor Claude André Deseine had made a large sculpture of General Colbert during the First French Empire.
Under Louis Philippe Laitié transformed it into a statue of Marshal Mortier, which was placed in the first court of the palace of Versailles.
In 1963 it was moved to Le Plessis-Trévise, the marshal's home town.

In 1830 Laitié made the central figure of Charity for the portico of Notre-Dame-de-Lorette, Paris.
It is flanked by Faith by Denis Foyatier and Hope by Philippe Henri Lemaire.

Works

Laitié's works include:
1812 Bust of Man (marble)
1814 Bust of the king
1817 Astronomer, bas-relief intended for the fountain of the Bastille. 
1819 St. John the Baptist
1822 marble bust of Nicolas-Pierre Tiolier, engraver-general of currencies
1822 Statue of Jean de La Fontaine, marble, 6 ft high, for the town of Château-Thierry
1822 St. Luke, stone statue, 12 ft high for Arras Cathedral
1824 Charity plaster group for the church of Saint-Étienne-du-Mont
1824 Stone bas-relief stone for the center of the courtyard of the Louvre, representing Justice and Strength
1824 Bust of Mme Tiolier
1827 Homer plaster statue 5 ft 9 inches.
 Relief for the ceiling of the staircase of the Paris Bourse, representing Themis and Mercury
1825 Marble bas relief, representing Painting placed in the grand staircase of the Museum, 6 ft, included in the exhibition of 1827

References

Sources

1782 births
1862 deaths
19th-century French sculptors
French male sculptors
19th-century French male artists